The Bank of Canada Act (the Act) is a statute that sets out the governance structure and powers of the Bank of Canada, which was created in 1934 as Canada's central bank.

Prior to 1934, Canada had no central bank and fragmented control of the banking system. The Canadian Bankers Association took the role of regulating the bank system since 1891 and the Bank of Montreal was the government's banker. In The Bank of Canada Act, 1934, The Bank of Canada was incorporated as a central bank "to regulate credit and currency in the best interests of the economic life of the nation ... and generally to promote the economic and financial welfare of the Dominion."

Under Section 24, it was given the sole right to issue notes payable to the bearer on demand and issue notes to any amount. Under Section 25, these notes (known as legal tender) could be converted to gold at the head office in Ottawa, in the form of bars containing approximately four hundred ounces of gold. The bank continues in the current Act to be the sole institution to issue notes. The bank must provide an adequate supply as required for circulation in Canada. The Act requires all banknotes of the Canadian dollar to be approved by the Minister of Finance for "form and material".

The bank had to maintain a reserve as security against its outstanding notes and deposit liabilities. This was an amount of gold coin and bullion comprising 25% of the notes and deposit liabilities, silver bullion and foreign exchange. The bank also held the Government of Canada's supply of gold and silver and Government of Canada securities. The bank was required to provide to the Minister of Finance each Wednesday a statement of assets and liabilities, which was published the following week in the Canada Gazette.

The bank became a government-owned corporation in 1938. Amendments to the Act allowed the Bank of Canada to divide the capital of the bank into one hundred thousand shares of a value of fifty dollars each, which were issued to the Minister of Finance to be held on behalf of Her Majesty in right of Canada. This provision remains in the current Bank of Canada Act, which has been amended numerous times. The Act provides for the provision of increases in its capital as directed by the Minister.

Under the act, the bank is governed by a board of directors composed of a governor, deputy governor and twelve (originally seven) directors, including the deputy minister of finance. The management of the bank is done by the governor, who is the chief executive officer, plus the deputy governor and assistant deputy governors. They are appointed for terms of seven years, at salaries determined by the directors of the bank. Directors of the bank are to be determined from various occupations, but candidates must be Canadian citizens (originally British subjects) and not employed by other financial institutions or a shareholder in other financial institutions (originally this was chartered bank directorship, ownership or employment) and other requirements under the Act.

See also

 Federal Reserve Act 
 Exchange Fund Ordinance 
 Bank of England Act 1716 
 Canada Deposit Insurance Corporation Act

References

Citations

Sources

External links
 Bank of Canada Act (R.S.C., 1985, c. B-2)

1934 in Canadian law
Bank of Canada Act
Banking legislation
Canadian federal legislation
Monetary reform
1934 in economics